The men's pole vault event at the 2003 European Athletics U23 Championships was held in Bydgoszcz, Poland, at Zawisza Stadion on 18 and 20 July.

Medalists

Results

Final
20 July

Qualifications
18 July
Qualifying 5.40 or 12 best to the Final

Group A

Group B

Participation
According to an unofficial count, 23 athletes from 13 countries participated in the event.

 (1)
 (3)
 (3)
 (1)
 (2)
 (1)
 (2)
 (2)
 (1)
 (2)
 (2)
 (2)
 (1)

References

Pole vault
Pole vault at the European Athletics U23 Championships